Kyriakos Bogiatzis (born 25 March 1956) is a Greek wrestler. He competed in the men's freestyle 74 kg at the 1984 Summer Olympics.

References

External links
 

1956 births
Living people
Greek male sport wrestlers
Olympic wrestlers of Greece
Wrestlers at the 1984 Summer Olympics
Place of birth missing (living people)